Oscar Otte (born 16 July 1993) is a German professional tennis player. He has been ranked as high as world No. 36 in singles by the Association of Tennis Professionals (ATP), which he achieved on 27 June 2022, and has a career-high doubles ranking of world No. 161, attained in May 2017.

Since turning professional in 2011, Otte has won 23 singles and doubles titles on the ITF World Tennis Tour and seven on the ATP Challenger Tour. After several years of failing to qualify for most Grand Slam tournaments, he produced consistency in 2021 by entering into three consecutive main draws and showed his best performance at a major at the 2021 US Open, where he upset 20th seed Lorenzo Sonego in the first round and ultimately reached the fourth round. In January 2022, he made his top 100 debut in the singles rankings and emerged into the top 50 five months later, following his first career ATP 500 semifinal at the 2022 Halle Open.

Tennis career

2017: First Challenger doubles title
Otte made a remarkable run at the Qingdao Challenger, where he reached the final both in the singles (as a qualifier) and in the doubles tournament.

He won his first ATP Challenger Tour doubles title at the Garden Open in Rome, partnering Andreas Mies. A few weeks later, he won his first Challenger singles title in Lisbon.

2018–2020: Grand Slam debut, Challenger tour success 
Otte made his Grand Slam main draw debut at the 2018 French Open as a lucky loser but despite winning the opening set he lost in the first round to Matteo Berrettini.

He won his first singles match on the ATP Tour at the Stockholm Open, defeating Jürgen Zopp in the first round.

Otte qualified again for the main draw at the 2019 French Open as a lucky loser and reached the second round by defeating Malek Jaziri. He lost in the second round to 3rd seed Roger Federer.

2021: Three consecutive major qualifications, US Open fourth round
Otte started his 2021 season at the Australian Open. He lost in the first round of qualifying to Roman Safiullin.

Seeded fifth at the Play In Challenger, Otte lost in the first round to Giulio Zeppieri.

Otte qualified for the main draw at the French Open for a third time in his career. He lost to compatriot Alexander Zverev in the first round, despite winning the first two sets.

He also qualified for the Wimbledon Championships main draw for the first time in his career. In the first round, Otte won only the second 12–12 singles tiebreak since that rule began two years ago, beating fellow qualifier Arthur Rinderknech 4–6, 6–3, 6–2, 6–7(5–7), 13–12(7–2) in almost 4 hours over two days. In the second round, Otte was defeated by Andy Murray in a five-set match on Centre Court, 6–3, 4–6, 4–6, 6–4, 6–2.

Ranked No. 144, he qualified for his third consecutive Grand Slam main draw in 2021 at the US Open also for the first time in his career. He reached the fourth round for the first time at this Major and in his career defeating 20th seed Lorenzo Sonego, Denis Kudla and Andreas Seppi. He was the third of a trio of qualifiers who reached the fourth round for the first time since the tournament began keeping qualifying records in 1982 and the lowest-ranked at this major since No. 179 Jiří Novák in 2006. It also marked the first time at any Grand Slam tournament that three male qualifiers reached the second week since the 1995 French Open.

2022: Two ATP 250 and ATP 500 semifinals, top-20 wins, top 40 debut
Otte started his 2022 season at the Adelaide International 1. He lost in the final round of qualifying to Taro Daniel. At the Adelaide International 2, he was defeated in the first round of qualifying by Steve Johnson. Ranked 96 at the Australian Open, he recorded his first victory at this major by defeating wildcard Tseng Chun-hsin in the first round. He lost in the second round to 25th seed and world No. 26, Lorenzo Sonego.

In February, Otte competed at the first edition of the Dallas Open. He lost in the first round to American wildcard Jack Sock. At the Delray Beach Open, he was eliminated in the second round by top seed, world No. 13, and eventual champion, Cam Norrie. Getting past qualifying at the Mexican Open, he was beaten in the first round by eighth seed and world No. 17, Pablo Carreño Busta. In Indian Wells, he lost in the second round to 11th seed, Hubert Hurkacz, in three sets. At the Arizona Classic, he was defeated in the first round by Radu Albot. At the Miami Open, he was ousted from the tournament in the second round by 22nd seed and world No. 24, Gaël Monfils.

Otte started his clay-court season at the Monte-Carlo Masters. Entering the main draw as a lucky loser, he lost in the first round to qualifier Emil Ruusuvuori. At the Serbia Open, he upset fourth seed and last year finalist, Aslan Karatsev, in the second round. He lost in the quarterfinals to sixth seed Fabio Fognini. At his next tournament in Munich, he beat third seed and world No. 17, Reilly Opelka, in the second round to claim his first top-20 win. He defeated lucky loser, Alejandro Tabilo, in the quarterfinals to reach his first ATP Tour-level semifinal. He fell in his semifinal match to wildcard Holger Rune, who would end up winning the tournament. At the Lyon Open, he lost in the second round to seventh seed Sebastián Báez. Ranked 59 at the French Open, he lost in the first round to Roberto Carballés Baena in five sets.

Otte started his grass-court season at the Stuttgart Open. He beat fourth seed and world No. 16, Denis Shapovalov, in the second round for his second top-20 win and biggest in his career thus far. He reached the semifinals of a tournament for the second time this season and lost to second seed and world No. 10, Matteo Berrettini, who would win the title. As a result of his Stuttgart run, Otte received a Special Exempt into the Halle Open. There on his debut, he defeated Miomir Kecmanović and Nikoloz Basilashvili to reach the quarterfinals of an ATP 500 tournament for the first time in his career. He then beat eighth seed and world No. 23, Karen Khachanov, to advance to his third consecutive semifinal on home soil. In the semifinals, he lost to top seed and eventual finalist, Daniil Medvedev. Due to a great result in Halle, his ranking improved from 51 to 36. At Wimbledon, he reached the third round for the first time in his career and lost to rising star, fifth seed, and world No. 7, Carlos Alcaraz.

After Wimbledon, Otte announced that he underwent an arthroscopy on the inner meniscus of his left knee. In August, he announced that he is fit and would be ready for New York. Ranked 41 at the US Open, he lost in the first round to eighth seed and world No. 10, Hubert Hurkacz.

After the US Open, Otte represented Germany in the Davis Cup Group stage. Germany was in Group C alongside France, Belgium, and Australia. Against France, he lost to Adrian Mannarino. Against Belgium, he was defeated by David Goffin. Against Australia, he lost to Thanasi Kokkinakis. In the end, Germany defeated France 2–1, Belgium 2–1, and Australia 2–1 to qualify for the knockout stage.

Otte reached his first final on the ATP Tour in the doubles draw of the Sofia Open, partnering Fabian Fallert.

Performance timelines

Singles
Current through the 2023 Indian Wells Masters.

Doubles

ATP career finals

Doubles: 1 (1 runner-up)

ATP Challenger and ITF Futures finals

Singles: 23 (13–10)

Doubles: 25 (17–8)

Record against top 10 players
Otte's match record against players who have been ranked in the top 10. Only ATP Tour main-draw matches are considered.

  Richard Gasquet 1–0
  Lucas Pouille 1–0
  Denis Shapovalov 1–0
  Karen Khachanov 1–1
  Carlos Alcaraz 0–1
  Pablo Carreño Busta 0–1
  Marin Čilić 0–1
  Roger Federer 0–1
  Fabio Fognini 0–1
  David Goffin 0–1
  John Isner 0–1
  Daniil Medvedev 0–1
  Gaël Monfils 0–1
  Andy Murray 0–1
  Cameron Norrie 0–1
  Holger Rune 0–1
  Diego Schwartzman 0–1
  Jack Sock 0–1
  Alexander Zverev 0–1
  Félix Auger-Aliassime 0–2
  Hubert Hurkacz 0–2
  Matteo Berrettini 0–3

* .

References

External links
 
 
 

1993 births
Living people
German male tennis players
Tennis players from Cologne
21st-century German people